The Flintstone Funnies is an American animated package show produced by Hanna-Barbera that aired on NBC from September 18, 1982 to September 8, 1984. This is the final incarnation of The Flintstones that premiered on NBC.

The series consisted of repackaged reruns of the six segments from The Flintstone Comedy Show (two and/or three segments aired per half-hour episode). The segments included The Flintstone Family Adventures, Bedrock Cops, Pebbles, Dino and Bamm-Bamm, Captain Caveman, Dino and Cavemouse and The Frankenstones.

Episodes
For episode titles and synopsis, see The Flintstone Comedy Show

Voice cast
 Gay Autterson as Betty Rubble, Wiggy Rockstone
 Mel Blanc as Barney Rubble, Captain Caveman, Dino
 Henry Corden as Fred Flintstone
 Ruta Lee as Hidea Frankenstone
 Kenneth Mars as Lou Granite
 Mitzi McCall as Penny Pillar
 Don Messick as Schleprock
 Charles Nelson Reilly as Frank Frankenstone
 Paul Reubens as Freaky Frankenstone
 Zelda Rubinstein as Atrocia Frankenstone
 Michael Sheehan as Bamm-Bamm Rubble
 John Stephenson as Mr. Slate
 Russi Taylor as Pebbles Flintstone, Cavemouse
 Jean Vander Pyl as Wilma Flintstone
 Lennie Weinrib as Moonrock Crater, Sgt. Boulder
 Frank Welker as Shmoo, Rockjaw

References

External links

The Flintstone Funnies at the Big Cartoon DataBase

The Flintstones spin-offs
1982 American television series debuts
1984 American television series endings
1980s American animated television series
American animated television spin-offs
American children's animated comedy television series
Crossover animated television series
Li'l Abner
NBC original programming
Television series by Hanna-Barbera
Television series set in prehistory
Television series about cavemen